Kethamreddy Vinod Reddy (born 17 July 1982) is an Indian politician and the former state general secretary of the Indian Youth Congress, Andhra Pradesh. At present, he is working as Nellore City Incharge of Jana Sena Party post 2019 General Elections by contesting as MLA Candidate of the party.

Early life
Vinod Reddy was born on 17 July 1982 at Nellore City. He is not from a political background family. His father  Vasudeva Reddy is a Police Constable and his mother Vani is a housewife.
Since his father is police constable and had transfers to various locations, Vinod Reddy completed his primary and secondary education at Sullurupeta, Intermediate at Gudur  and Bachelor of Computer Application (BCA) at University of Madras, Chennai. After completion  of his under graduation, he started his own business in corporate advertising in the name of inventive ads  during  the year 2002 and continuing that.

Political career

During 2003-2005, Vinod Reddy worked as constituency president of National Students' Union of India (NSUI), Gudur. Later in 2006, he worked as Workers committee member, Indian Youth Congress, Nellore City. In 2008, he had taken a political pilot project, Rahul Yuva Baata. In 2009, he was the president of Nellore District Congress Party publicity wing. In 2012 and 2014, he was the president of  Indian Youth Congress, Nellore City and Nellore District respectively. In 2015, he worked as State Social Media Coordinator of the Indian National Congress, Andhra Pradesh and in 2016, he was the State General Secretary of the Indian Youth Congress, Andhra Pradesh.

During 2017, he undertook a political movement by name Save Nellore, questioning the loans acquired by Nellore Municipal Corporation from Housing and Urban Development Corporation (HUDCO). Later in 2018, he joined Jana Sena Party inspired by Pawan Kalyan, President of the party and contested as MLA Candidate of Nellore city competing with the ex Minister of Irrigation, then sitting MLA Anil Kumar Poluboina of YSR Congress Party and corporate colleges giant, then State Minister of Municipal Administration Ponguru Narayana of Telugu Desam Party.

Pawananna Praja Bata
On May 17, 2022, he launched a door-to-door political campaign in the Nellore City constituency under the name Pawananna Praja Bata, which means "Pawan Kalyan's People Path" stating his party's ideology and why Pawan Kalyan should be made the Chief minister of Andhra Pradesh.

References

1982 births
Living people
People from Nellore district
Jana Sena Party politicians
People from Nellore

External links